The Shannon Burke Show is a  conservative American radio talk show talk show based in Orlando, Florida.

History 

Florida Man Radio 660AM/105.5FM Orlando, 103.1FM Fort Walton Beach, with co-host/Executive Producer Jeff Adams and Eazy E Producer.

The Shannon Burke Show aired in Atlanta on 106.7 WYAY-FM. Its final broadcast on WYAY (106.7 FM) was May 31, 2019 as Atlanta-based Cumulus Media sold the station to K-Love, a Christian pop network (owned by Educational Media Foundation).

WFLF  
 Shannon Burke (2003–2004) covered mornings for WFLF/540.

WTKS-FM 
 Shannon Burke (May 2004 – April 2009) was host of the mid-day show.

Termination from Clear Channel Communications 
Clear Channel Communications terminated the employment of Burke effective May 4, 2009. The news was first announced by Jim Philips during The Philips Phile show on May 4, 2009.

See also
 Bubba the Love Sponge
 The Monsters in the Morning

References

External links 
 Fistful Of Radio
 Florida Man Radio
 The Bubba The Lovesponge Show
 Shannon Burke on RadioIO
 102.5 The BONE
 Real Radio 104.1 (WTKS) Official Website
 Unofficial Forum created by Real Radio Fans

American talk radio programs